In classical mechanics, the precession of a rigid body such as a spinning top under the influence of gravity is not, in general, an integrable problem. There are however three (or four) famous cases that are integrable, the Euler, the Lagrange, and the Kovalevskaya top. In addition to the energy, each of these tops involves three additional constants of motion that give rise to the integrability. 

The Euler top describes a free top without any particular symmetry, moving in the absence of any external torque in which the fixed point is the center of gravity. The Lagrange top is a symmetric top, in which two moments of inertia are the same and the center of gravity lies on the symmetry axis. The Kovalevskaya top is a special symmetric top with a unique ratio of the moments of inertia which satisfy the relation

 

That is, two moments of inertia are equal, the third is half as large, and the center of gravity is located in the plane perpendicular to the symmetry axis (parallel to the plane of the two equal points). The nonholonomic Goryachev–Chaplygin top (introduced by D. Goryachev in 1900 and integrated by Sergey Chaplygin in 1948) is also integrable. Its center of gravity lies in the equatorial plane. It has been proven that no other holonomic integrable tops exist.

Hamiltonian formulation of classical tops

In a Hamiltonian formulation of classical tops, the conjugate dynamical variables are the components of the angular momentum vector  along the principal axes

 

and the z-components of the three principal axes, 

 

The Poisson algebra of these variables is given by

 

 

The equations of motion are then determined by

Euler top

The Euler top, named after Leonhard Euler, is an untorqued top, with Hamiltonian

 

The four constants of motion are the energy  and the three components of angular momentum  in the lab frame,

Lagrange top

The Lagrange top, named after Joseph-Louis Lagrange, is a symmetric top with the center of mass along the symmetry axis at location, with Hamiltonian

 

The four constants of motion are the energy , the angular momentum component along the symmetry axis, the angular momentum in the z-direction

 

and the magnitude of the n-vector

Kovalevskaya top

It was discovered by Sofia Kovalevskaya in 1888 and presented in her paper "Sur le problème de la rotation d'un corps solide autour d'un point fixe", which won the Prix Bordin from the French Academy of Sciences in 1888. The Hamiltonian is

 

The four constants of motion are the energy ,  the Kovalevskaya invariant

where the variables  are defined by

 

the angular momentum component in the z-direction,

 

and the magnitude of the n-vector

See also

Cardan suspension

References

External links
 Kovalevskaya Top – from Eric Weisstein's World of Physics
 Kovalevskaya Top

Tops
Hamiltonian mechanics